Bona Makes You Sweat is the first live album by Cameroonian jazz bassist and musician Richard Bona. It was recorded in A 38 club in Budapest, Hungary in 2007, and released on March 7, 2008, through Universal Music Jazz France. The album has charted in France.

Bona said, "After every concert I’ve ever played, I get people coming up saying they’d love to have a souvenir of the show. That’s the reason I recorded this album—for my fans."

Critical reception

"Bona’s fifth and latest album—his first live recording—further confirms what we already know: Bona is one of the master electric bassists in our midst, not to mention a vocal conjurer with a natural flair, but one who tends to adopt the garb of sweet-spirited, unpretentious entertainer in his role as solo artist. (...) For all his deep-dish musicality and capacity for virtuosity on tap, in his role as a bandleader, Bona likes to keep the party rolling and the material on the simple, celebratory side," wrote Josef Woodard in his review for JazzTimes.

Daniel Lieuze of RFI Musique praised Bona's vocals: "A few tracks on, with the superb Indiscretions & Please Don’t [Stop], Bona stands up there live on stage and proves3lest there should linger even the slightest doubt—that as an instrumentalist he has a voice to rival the great George Benson’s. Bona is intent on showing off the many facets of that vocal timbre on Samaouma, an ‘a cappella’ polyphony which recalls the church songs he performed as a young boy growing up in Minta, his home village in eastern Cameroon."

Track listing

Personnel

Credits adapted from AllMusic.

 Richard Bona – bass guitar, vocals, mixing, production 

Additional musicians
 John Caban – guitar
 Taylor Haskins – trumpet
 Ernesto Simpson – drums
 Etienne Stadwijk – keyboards
 Samuel Torres – percussion

Additional personnel
 Daniel Richard – executive production
 Daniel Boivin – engineering
 Pete Karam – mixing
 Tom Arndt – release coordination
 Pascal Bod – release coordination
 Garrett Shelton – release coordination
 David Passick – representation
 Akwa Betote – photography
 Philippe Savoir – design

Chart performance

References

Richard Bona albums
2008 live albums